Old English is an early form of the English language spoken by Anglo-Saxons until the 12th century.

Old English or Olde English may also refer to:

Arts and entertainment 
 Olde English (sketch comedy), an American comedy troupe
 Old English (film), a 1930 American pre-Code drama

Beverages 
 A cider from Gaymer Cider Company
 Olde English 800, an American malt liquor

Language and typography 
 Early Modern English, the language of Shakespeare and the King James Bible, sometimes referred to colloquially as old English
 Old English, a style of handwriting or typeface, also known as Blackletter

Peoples 
 Old English (Ireland), 12th-century settlers from England
 Anglo-Saxons, 5th-century invaders of Britain

Other uses 
 A furniture polish and wood care product manufactured by Reckitt Benckiser

See also
 History of the English language
 Anglo-Saxon England
 Anglo-Saxon (disambiguation)
 New English (disambiguation)